Miss Universe Malaysia 2019, the 53rd edition of the Miss Universe Malaysia, was held on 7 March 2019 at the Majestic Araneta Auditorium, Kuala Lumpur. Shweta Sekhon of Kuala Lumpur was crowned by the outgoing titleholder, Jane Teoh  of Penang at the end of the event. She then represented Malaysia at the Miss Universe 2019 pageant in Atlanta, United States.

Results

Gala Night Judges 

 Alia Bastamam - Fashion designer and creative director
 Dato' Dr. JasG - Glojas Smart International Aesthetic CEO and founder
 Kiran Jassal - Miss Universe Malaysia 2016
 Lynn Lim - Actress
 Miko Au - Miko Galere celebrity hairstylist
 Dr. Nicholas Lim - La Jung Clinic Medical Director
 TJ Chan - Malaysia Airlines Berhad Head of Branding and Marketing Communications
 Whulandary Herman – Miss Universe Indonesia 2013

Special awards

Contestants
Official 18 Finalists of Miss Universe Malaysia 2019.

Color Key

Webisodes 
The top 18 finalists were featured in an online show, “The Next Miss Universe Malaysia 2019” consisting of six episodes of their personal profiles, followed by 12 episodes of their journey leading to the crowning of Miss Universe Malaysia 2019.

Crossovers 
Contestants who previously competed/appeared at other international/national beauty pageants:

International Pageants

Supermodel International
2017: Su Lee Hsien (Top 10)

Miss Asia Pacific International
2016: Rishon Shun

Miss Tourism Queen International 
 2016 - Cassandra Jeremiah (Best National Costume)

 National Pageants

Miss Grand Malaysia
 2018 - Saroopdeep Bath (1st Runner-up)

Miss World Malaysia
 2014 - Cassandra Jeremiah (2nd Runner-up) 2016  - Shweta Sekhon (2nd Runner-up, later Miss World Malaysia 2016)Miss Global Intercontinental Malaysia
 2016 - Cassandra Jeremiah (2nd Runner-up)Miss Malaysia Tourism
 2015 - Rishon Shun (Miss Malaysia Tourism Queen of the Year)Miss Perak Tourism
 2015 - Rishon Shun (Winner)Supermodel International Malaysia
2017: Su Lee Hsien (Winner)''

References

External links 
 
 

2019 in Malaysia
2019 beauty pageants
2019
Miss Universe
Women in Kuala Lumpur